Ocularia rotundipennis is a species of beetle in the family Cerambycidae. It was described by Stephan von Breuning in 1950.

References

Oculariini
Beetles described in 1950
Taxa named by Stephan von Breuning (entomologist)